Stillwell is an American rock band formed by Q-Unique from The Arsonists and Kings Bounty, Reginald "Fieldy" Arvizu from Korn, and Wuv from P.O.D. The band has released three albums and one EP. They released their third studio album, Supernatural Miracle, on September 18, 2020.

History 

Stillwell formed in early 2006, quickly entering the studio, and putting out their first single, "Killing Myself to Live" in October 2007. Since then, the band has been off-and-on recording their first album, although Fieldy's involvement in Korn is thought to play a factor in the long recording process.

The band released their first album, a CD/DVD package, titled Dirtbag in 2011. They have released several trailers for the album, which can be seen on YouTube.

StillWell were confirmed to be opening for Korn during the second leg of the Music as a Weapon V Tour. Along with this news, several tracks were confirmed to appear on Dirtbag, such as "Golden Ticket", "Magnetic Daze", and a cover of Led Zeppelin's "Whole Lotta Love".

Dirtbag became available to download on iTunes on April 2, 2011. It was released in physical format on May 10, 2011. "You Can't Stop Me" has also been released as the album's lead single. A music video for "You Can't Stop Me" premiered on August 10, 2011, directed by Sébastien Paquet, Scott Keyzers, and Joshua Allen.

StillWell released their album entitled Raise It Up on November 13, 2015, that contained songs including "Mess I Made" and "Raise It Up".

Style 
William Ruhlmann, writing for AllMusic, said that "Stillwell helpfully calls its music "street metal," which seems to be a combination of rap and heavy metal, but for the most part on Dirtbag, it sounds like a conventional, straightforward hard rock group".

Members 
 Current members
 Q-Unique – vocals (2006–present), guitars (2018–present)
 Reginald "Fieldy" Arvizu – bass (2006, 2018–present), guitars (2011–2018)
 Noah "Wuv" Bernardo – drums (2006–present)

 Former members
 Pablo "Spider" Silva – bass (2006–2018)

Discography

Studio albums

Extended plays

Music videos

References

External links 
 Official Website
 Official Facebook account

Hard rock musical groups from California
Korn solo projects